Juan Felipe Aguirre Tabares (born 29 August 1996) is a Colombian footballer who currently plays as a centre-back for Atlético Nacional.

Career statistics

Club

Notes

References

1996 births
Living people
Colombian footballers
Colombian expatriate footballers
Association football defenders
Sportspeople from Antioquia Department
Categoría Primera B players
Categoría Primera A players
Ascenso MX players
Uruguayan Primera División players
Leones F.C. footballers
Club Celaya footballers
Montevideo Wanderers F.C. players
Atlético Nacional footballers
Colombian expatriate sportspeople in Mexico
Colombian expatriate sportspeople in Uruguay
Expatriate footballers in Mexico
Expatriate footballers in Uruguay